La Vertiente Airport may refer to:

 La Vertiente Airport (Bolivia) in La Vertiente, Tarija, Bolivia
 La Vertiente Airport (Chile) near Chillán, Bío Bío, Chile